"Why Baby Why" is a song written by Larry Harrison and Luther Dixon and performed by Pat Boone.  It reached #5 on the U.S. pop chart and #17 on the UK Singles Chart in 1957.

The single was produced by Randy Wood and arranged by Billy Vaughn.

Other versions
P. J. Proby released a version of the song on his 1968 album What's Wrong with My World.  It was produced by Bob Reisdorff and Les Reed.

References

1957 songs
1957 singles
Songs written by Luther Dixon
Pat Boone songs
Dot Records singles